Storbrettingskollen is a mountain in Lom Municipality in Innlandet county, Norway. The mountain is surrounded by several other notable mountains including Ryggehøi, Skardtind, and Rundkollan to the west; Kjølen, Søre Kjølhaugen, and Knatthøin to the north; and Gjerdinghøi and Lauvknubben to the south.

See also
List of mountains of Norway

References

Lom, Norway
Mountains of Innlandet